Drops of Jupiter is the second studio album by American pop rock band Train, released on March 27, 2001. The album's title is derived from "Drops of Jupiter (Tell Me)", its lead single, which was a hit internationally and won the Grammy Award for Best Rock Song.

The album contains elements of rock, country and indie rock.  Besides "Drops of Jupiter (Tell Me)", two other singles were released from this album:  "She's on Fire" and "Something More", both of which also achieved some success on the Adult Top 40 chart.

Debuting at #6 in the United States upon its release, it has since been certified 3× Platinum by the RIAA in the United States and 2× Platinum by the CRIA in Canada. It is the band's best-selling album to date.

A 20th Anniversary Edition was released on March 26, 2021.

Critical reception

The album received mixed reviews. AllMusic writer Mark Morgenstein said that "There is nothing cutting edge about Train's Sophomore Effort". He also stated that "Train is a classic rock wannabe band in the mold of Counting Crows, although that's not always a bad thing". Another mixed review appeared in Billboard, which wrote that "The music fails to gain any momentum until track seven, and by then, Train's lucky the listener's still spinning the CD...Let's hope that if Train's given the chance to make a third album, it'll finally fill it with clearly discernable songs."

Rolling Stone Writer Aidin Vaziri had this to say about the album: "Drops of Jupiter, conjuring vivid memories of Recovering The Satellites. The anthemic song is the centerpiece here, showcasing the singer's yearning voice and band's swooping, string-laden melodies, but Train has more to offer. The brooding "Mississippi" presents an intoxicating mix of acoustic guitars and dreamy horns, while "Let It Roll" mixes mournful slide guitars and loose-limbed rhythms in the perfect meeting of blustery earnestness and unapologetic commerciality."

Accolades

Track listing

Personnel
Adapted from AllMusic.

Train
Pat Monahan - lead vocals, percussion, saxophone, trumpet, vibraphone
Jimmy Stafford - lead guitar, backing vocals, mandolin
Rob Hotchkiss - rhythm guitar, backing vocals, bass, harmonica
Charlie Colin - bass, backing vocals, rhythm guitar
Scott Underwood - drums, keyboards, percussion, programming

Additional musicians
Paul Buckmaster - conductor, string arrangements, orchestral arrangements
Greg Leisz - pedal steel guitar on Drops of Jupiter
Brendan O'Brien - keyboards
David Campbell - string arrangements
Carl Gorodetzky - violin, concertmaster, contractor
Suzie Katayama - cello, contractor
Chuck Leavell - piano
Michael Markman - violin
Bob Mason - cello
Fleming McWilliams - backing vocals 
Dan Smith - cello
Kris Wilkinson - viola
Evan Wilson - viola

Production
Tim Devine - A&R
Joel Zimmerman - art direction
Stephen Saper - authoring
Arnie Pustilnik - direction
David Bryant - engineer
Steve Churchyard - engineer
Nick DiDia - engineer
Ryan Williams - engineer
Karl Egsieker - assistant engineer
Steve Genewick - assistant engineer
Tony Hernandez - illustrations
Bob Ludwig - mastering
Ralf Strathmann - photography
Brendan O'Brien - producer, mixing
Erin Haley - production coordination
Cheryl Mondello - production coordination
Dakota Weir - Lead singer

Charts

Weekly charts

Year-end charts

Certifications

References

External links
Train official site

2001 albums
Train (band) albums
Albums produced by Brendan O'Brien (record producer)
Columbia Records albums